Sing Along with Basie is an album by vocalese jazz group Lambert, Hendricks & Ross with Joe Williams and the Count Basie Orchestra recorded in 1958 and originally released on the Roulette label.

Reception

AllMusic awarded the album 4 stars and its review by Scott Yanow states: "it is quite fascinating to hear."

Track listing
 "Jumpin' at the Woodside" (Count Basie) – 3:18
 "Goin' to Chicago Blues" (Basie, Jimmy Rushing) – 4:11
 "Tickle Toe" (Lester Young) – 2:37
 "Let Me See" (Basie, Harry Edison) – 3:13
 "Every Tub" (Basie, Eddie Durham) – 3:23
 "Shorty George" (Basie, Andy Gibson) – 3:06
 "Rusty Dusty Blues" (J. Mayo Williams) – 3:44
 "The King" (Basie) – 3:22
 "Swingin' the Blues" (Basie, Durham) – 3:02
 "Li'l Darlin'" (Neal Hefti) – 4:37

Personnel 
Jon Hendricks, Dave Lambert, Annie Ross, Joe Williams – vocals
Count Basie – piano
Wendell Culley, Thad Jones, Joe Newman, Snooky Young – trumpet
Henry Coker, Al Grey, Benny Powell – trombone
Marshal Royal – alto saxophone, clarinet
Frank Wess – alto saxophone, tenor saxophone, flute
Frank Foster, Billy Mitchell – tenor saxophone
Charlie Fowlkes – baritone saxophone
Freddie Green – guitar
Eddie Jones – bass
Sonny Payne – drums

References 

1958 albums
Lambert, Hendricks & Ross albums
Count Basie Orchestra albums
Joe Williams (jazz singer) albums
Roulette Records albums
Albums arranged by Neal Hefti
Albums produced by Teddy Reig